Mark Duane Karcher (born November 22, 1978) is a retired American professional basketball player who was selected by the Philadelphia 76ers in the 2nd round (48th pick) in the 2000 NBA Draft. Although his professional career spanned seven years, he never played in a regular season NBA game, making him 1 of 8 players from the 2000 NBA Draft to never play in the league.

College career
Ineligible as a freshman in 1997–98, Karcher played two years of college basketball as a guard/forward with Temple University from 1998 to 2000 before leaving early to enter the 2000 NBA Draft.

Professional career
Karcher participated in training camp with the Philadelphia 76ers, but never played for them in a regular season game. He was selected with the 59th pick in the 2001 NBA D-League draft by the Greenville Groove, and would also play for the Richmond Rhythm of the International Basketball League that same year. In 2005, he participated in training camp with the Utah Jazz but was not signed to a contract. He spent the majority of his professional playing career overseas. Karcher played in France with Hyères-Toulon in the French top-tier league, the LNB Pro A, and with ALM Évreux Basket, in the French 2nd-tier league, the LNB Pro B. After five years in France, Karcher spent one year in Iran, followed by one year in Argentina, before ending his playing career in 2007.

References

External links
 French League Profile 
 NBA D-League stats

1978 births
Living people
ALM Évreux Basket players
American expatriate basketball people in Argentina
American expatriate basketball people in France
American expatriate basketball people in Iran
American men's basketball coaches
American men's basketball players
Basketball players from Baltimore
Fayetteville Patriots players
High school basketball coaches in Maryland
HTV Basket players
McDonald's High School All-Americans
Parade High School All-Americans (boys' basketball)
Philadelphia 76ers draft picks
Richmond Rhythm players
Shooting guards
Small forwards
Temple Owls men's basketball players